In the business world, amalgamated refers to an organization that has undergone consolidation (also known as amalgamation). Amalgamated organizations may use "amalgamated" in their name to signify that it is the amalgamation of its component companies or trade unions.

North America 
 Amalgamated Bank, a union-owned bank based in New York City
 Amalgamated Bank of Chicago, a bank founded in 1923 by the ACWA and now owned by UNITE HERE
 Amalgamated Lithographers of America
 Amalgamated Sugar Company
 Amalgamated Transit Union, a United States and Canada based union
 Amalgamated Advertising
 Dominica Amalgamated Workers' Union
 Amalgamated Workers Union, a trade union in Trinidad and Tobago

Since disbanded or further amalgamated 
 Amalgamated Association of Iron and Steel Workers, a historical trade union
 Amalgamated Clothing Workers of America
 Amalgamated Machinery Corporation, manufacturers of the Amalgamated
 Amalgamated Meat Cutters, a North American trade union

United Kingdom 
 Chesham Amalgamations, a British mergers and acquisitions broking company
 Amalgamated Anthracite Holdings Limited

Since disbanded or further amalgamated 
 Amalgamated Engineering and Electrical Union, a historical British trade union (formerly known as the Amalgamated Society of Engineers)
 Amalgamated Marine Workers' Union
 Associated Motor Cycles, briefly known as "Amalgamated Motor Cycles Ltd"
 MGM-British Studios, previously "Amalgamated Studios"
 Amalgamated Society of Carpenters and Joiners, a British organisation formed during the 1860s
 Amalgamated Union of Building Trade Workers
 Anglo-Amalgamated, a British film production company from the 1930s to the 1970s, responsible for some of the early "Carry On" films
 Fleetway Publications, formerly known as "Amalgamated Press".
 Amalgamated Association of Brass Turners, Fitters, Finishers and Coppersmiths
 Amalgamated Slaters', Tilers' and Roofing Operatives' Society
 Amalgamated Society of Tailors and Tailoresses
 Amalgamated Society of Foremen Lightermen of River Thames
 Transport and General Workers' Union, formerly known as the Amalgamated Association of Carters and Motormen
 Amalgamated Carters, Lurrymen and Motormen's Union
 Amalgamated Engineering and Electrical Union
 Amalgamated Marine Workers' Union
 Amalgamated Society of Watermen, Lightermen and Bargemen
 Amalgamated Society of House Decorators and Painters
 Amalgamated Society of Coopers
 Amalgamated Society of Painters and Decorators
 Amalgamated Society of Lithographic Printers
 Amalgamated Society of Dyers, Finishers and Kindred Trades
 Amalgamated Weavers' Association
 Cardroom Amalgamation
 Irish Bakers' National Amalgamated Union
 Humber Amalgamated Steam Trawler Engineers and Firemen's Union
 National Amalgamated Stevedores and Dockers
 National Amalgamated Union of Enginemen, Firemen, Mechanics, Motormen and Electrical Workers
 National Amalgamated Labourers' Union
 National Amalgamated Coal Workers' Union
 National Amalgamated Association of Tin Plate Workers
 North East Lancashire Amalgamated Weavers' Association
 Sheffield Amalgamated Union of File Trades

Eastern Europe 
 Association of Amalgamated Territorial Communities

Asia and Oceania 
 Amalgamated Engineering Union
 Amalgamated Holdings Limited
 Amalgamated Wireless Australasia Limited
 Central Amalgamated Workers' Union
 Northern Amalgamated Workers' Union
 Southern Amalgamated Workers' Union

Botswana 
 Botswana Railways Amalgamated Workers' Union
 National Amalgamated Central, Local & Parastatal Manual Workers' Union, a Botswana-based organisation

In fiction 
 A large corporation called Consolidated Amalgamated figures in the plots of two films by Peter Hyams: Capricorn One (1978) and Outland (1981).
 Amalgamated Fluorodynamics is a fictional company in the Half-Life mod Science and Industry

Business terms